Rachel Jane Reeves (born 13 February 1979) is a British politician and economist serving as Shadow Chancellor of the Exchequer since 2021. A member of the Labour Party, she has been Member of Parliament for Leeds West since 2010.

Born in Lewisham in London, Reeves studied at New College, Oxford and the London School of Economics before working as an economist at the Bank of England, the British Embassy in Washington, D.C. and HBOS. Elected at the 2010 general election, she served in Ed Miliband's Shadow Cabinet as Shadow Chief Secretary to the Treasury from 2011 to 2013 and Shadow Secretary of State for Work and Pensions from 2013 to 2015.

Reeves did not return to the Shadow Cabinet following Jeremy Corbyn's election as Labour leader in 2015, instead serving as chair of the Business, Energy and Industrial Strategy Committee from 2017 to 2020. After Keir Starmer was elected as leader in 2020, he appointed Reeves as Shadow Chancellor of the Duchy of Lancaster and Shadow Minister for the Cabinet Office, shadowing Michael Gove. In May 2021, she replaced Anneliese Dodds as Shadow Chancellor of the Exchequer.

Early life and career
The daughter of teachers Graham and Sally Reeves of Lewisham, south-east London, Reeves was educated at Cator Park School for Girls in Bromley. At school, she won a British Under-14 girls chess championship title in a tournament organised by the now-defunct British Women's Chess Association. After sitting A-Levels in Politics, Economics, Mathematics and Further Mathematics, she read Philosophy, Politics and Economics at New College, Oxford (MA), achieving a 2.1. She then graduated as MSc in Economics from the London School of Economics. She worked as an economist at the Bank of England and British Embassy in Washington, D.C. between 2000 and 2006. Reeves moved to Leeds in 2006 to work for HBOS. She was once interviewed for a job at Goldman Sachs, but turned it down, despite claiming that the job could have made her "a lot richer".

Reeves cites the influence of her father on her and her sister Ellie Reeves MP on her socially democratic politics. She recalls how, when she was eight years old, her father, Graham, pointed out the then-Labour Party leader Neil Kinnock on the television and "told us that was who we voted for". Reeves says she and her sister have "both known we were Labour since then". She joined the Labour Party at the age of sixteen.

Political career
Reeves stood as the Labour Party parliamentary candidate in the Conservative safe seat of Bromley and Chislehurst at the 2005 general election, finishing second. She also contested the 2006 by-election in the same constituency, following the death of sitting Conservative Member of Parliament (MP) Eric Forth, and finished in fourth place – while the Lib Dems jumped to second. Labour support fell from 10,241 votes to 1,925, in what was described as a "humiliation" for Labour. The result was the worst performance for a governing party since 1991.

Reeves later sought nomination for the Leeds West seat at the 2010 general election, seeking to replace John Battle, who had chosen to retire. She was selected to contest the seat from an all-women shortlist of Labour Party prospective parliamentary candidates. She was elected with a majority of 7,016 on 6 May 2010 – a 5,794 reduction in the majority enjoyed by Battle. In her maiden speech, delivered on 8 June 2010, Reeves praised the work of Battle and committed to continue fighting for justice for the victims of the Armley asbestos disaster and their families. In a series of questions in Parliament, she enquired whether the government would honour promises by the previous government to compensate victims of asbestos diagnosed with pleural plaques, and bring legislation into force making it easier to pursue claims against insurers.
	
Following the 2010 election, Reeves supported Ed Miliband for the Labour leadership because she felt he was the candidate most willing to listen to what the voters were saying about where the party went wrong. After becoming an MP, Reeves was appointed to the Department for Business, Innovation and Skills Select Committee then as Shadow Pensions Minister in October 2010. In her role as Shadow Pensions Minister, she campaigned against the Government's proposed acceleration of equalising state pensions ages for men and women. She was promoted to the post of Shadow Chief Secretary to the Treasury in October 2011.

Appointed Shadow Secretary of State for Work and Pensions in 2013, Reeves proposed that anyone unemployed for two years, or one year if under 25 years old, would be required to take a guaranteed job or lose access to benefits. She caused controversy within the Labour Party by stating Labour would be "tougher" than the Conservative Party in cutting the benefits bill. She caused further controversy in early 2015 by stating "We [Labour] don’t want to be seen as, and we're not, the party to represent those who are out of work".

Following Jeremy Corbyn's election as leader in 2015, Reeves supported Owen Smith in the 2016 Labour Party leadership election. In September 2016, Reeves described her constituency as being "like a tinderbox" that could explode if immigration was not curbed. 

When Keir Starmer became Labour leader in 2020, Reeves was appointed as Shadow Chancellor of the Duchy of Lancaster, with responsibility for Labour's response to Brexit and shadowing Michael Gove.

Shadow Chancellor of the Exchequer
Reeves was promoted to the role of Shadow Chancellor of the Exchequer in a shadow cabinet reshuffle on 9 May 2021, replacing Anneliese Dodds.

In December 2021 Reeves said she would support a 2p cut to the Income Tax basic rate, if the Conservatives proposed that.  She opposed the planned 1.2% rise in National Insurance rates. Reeves said Labour planned to replace business rates with a new system that charged shops fairly compared to larger online businesses.

In an interview with the Financial Times, outlining her forthcoming speech in Bury on strengthening the economy, Reeves said a Starmer government would be pro-business and committed to fiscal discipline. She said Britain had seen Japanese-style Lost Decades of growth, which she said a Labour government would reverse through following fiscal rules and eliminating borrowing for day-to-day spending, with no unfunded election spending commitments. This she said would enable government capital spending, above the current 3% of GDP per year limit, to promote growth. Labour would be both pro-worker and pro-business. Reeves did not think Britain would rejoin European Union or its single market in the next 50 years. She said she was against the return of freedom of movement for workers between the UK and EU.

Reeves also said the falling membership of the Labour Party was a good thing, as it was shedding unwelcome supporters.

In her Bury speech on 20 January 2022, where she was introduced by MP Christian Wakeford who had recently defected to Labour from the Conservative Party, she added more detail to her plan:
 A £28 billion climate investment plan, which would create UK based jobs and support industry;
 A target to creating 100,000 new businesses over five years;
 Mutual recognition of professional qualifications with the EU;
 Veterinary agreements to help the food and drink industry;
 Restore visa-free touring for musicians.

Political positions and views
Reeves has written studies on the financial crisis of 2007–2010 for the Fabian Society's Fabian Review, the Institute of Public Policy Research, the Socialist Environment and Resources Association, and the European Journal of Political Economy. In an article for Renewal entitled "The Politics of Deficit Reduction", Reeves offers her critique of the then-current financial situation and efforts to bring down the budget deficit. Reeves was a proponent of quantitative easing in 2009, to alleviate the late-2000s recession having studied the effects of the policy on Japan in the early 2000s.

Reeves supports the High Speed 2 rail project, and raised the issue in the House of Commons, as well as campaigning for the proposed Kirkstall Forge railway station. In 2008 she was involved in the campaign to save the historic Bramley Baths and in 2011 the campaign to save the children's heart unit at Leeds General Infirmary.

Reeves is a vice-chair of Labour Friends of Israel, contributed a chapter to a book about Israeli politics and society, and supports the Auschwitz-Birkenau Foundation.

Writing
Echoing similar titles of publications by Roy Jenkins in 1959 and Tony Wright in 1997, Reeves wrote the new edition of Why Vote Labour? in the run-up to the 2010 general election, as part of a series giving the case for each of the main political parties.

Reeves's biography of the Labour politician Alice Bacon, Baroness Bacon (1909–1993), titled Alice in Westminster: The Political Life of Alice Bacon, was published in 2017. Bacon was the first and previously only woman to represent a Leeds constituency, having represented Leeds North East and then Leeds South East between 1945 and 1970.

She regularly contributes to The Guardian newspaper, as well as the websites LabourList and Progress.

Personal life
Reeves is married to Nicholas Joicey, a civil servant and Gordon Brown's former private secretary and speech writer. The couple have homes in Leeds (Bramley) and London. Reeves announced her first pregnancy on 20 September 2012, and gave birth to a daughter. and later a son in 2015.

Rachel's younger sister Ellie is the Labour MP for Lewisham West and Penge and is married to John Cryer, Labour MP for Leyton and Wanstead.

References

External links

 

 Fabian Society
 

|-

|-

|-

|-

|-

1979 births
Living people
Alumni of New College, Oxford
Alumni of the London School of Economics
British economists
Female members of the Parliament of the United Kingdom for English constituencies
English civil servants
English political writers
Labour Party (UK) MPs for English constituencies
Labour Friends of Israel
Lloyds Banking Group people
Members of the Fabian Society
People from Lewisham
UK MPs 2010–2015
UK MPs 2015–2017
UK MPs 2017–2019
UK MPs 2019–present
British women economists
21st-century British women politicians
21st-century English women
21st-century English people
Shadow Chancellors of the Exchequer
Members of the Privy Council of the United Kingdom